Little Tragedies (-Malenkiye Tragediyi) are a Russian language progressive rock, art rock and symphonic rock band from Russia. Arguably the most important progressive rock band in Russia.

Style 

The band described its style as "a battery of keyboards - drums - bass; hard rhythm section support and soloing keyboards". Little Tragedies has their very own style, influenced by classical music and heavy art rock. The music of Little Tragedies is very melodic and always features a keyboard solo with an improvisation accent. The band are one of the only progressive rock bands in Russia using Moog and Hammond keyboards. Most of the songs of the band are based on known Russian poets, especially Nikolai Gumilev. The name of the group itself is taken from a piece by Alexander Pushkin.

Due to the fact Ilyin moved to live in Germany, he sends the music scores to the band members via email, and after they learn it he arrives to Kursk for the rehearsals and recordings.

History 

Little Tragedies were founded in 1994 by the graduate of St. Petersburg Conservatory, composer Gennady Ilyin, in the city of Kursk, after previously performing with a band called Paradox. The name was taken from a play by Alexander Pushkin. The group's first recording, 1, was never recorded as an album. It exists only on an amateur videotape made from the group's only concert at that moment.
Since 1995 the band was a trio: Gennady Ilyin - keyboards; Yuri Skripkin - drums; Oleg Babynin - bass. With such a line-up the group played till 2000. After visiting Paris, Gennady Ilyin started working on the Paris Symphony. Although this album was recorded in a professional studio in Moscow and was more than once performed by the group in music schools and concert halls, it remained unrecognized until 2008 when the French label Musea Records surprisingly released it.

1997 - the beginning of 1998. It took G. Ilyin a month to compose a fairytale ballet "Magic Shop" about a little girl's Christmas adventures. He practiced it with the band and it was performed on the stage only two and a half years later. In the year 2000, Little Tragedies released their first two albums, The Sun of Spirit and Porcelain Pavilion, on  the record label Boheme Music. The albums were recorded by Ilyin in 1998–1999, with the help of musicians Igor Mihel (guitar) and Yevgeniy Shukin (audio engineering). Though originally recorded as Gennady Ilyin's solo albums, Ilyin decided to release the albums under the Little Tragedies name.

In summer 2000, Alexander Malakhovsky (guitar) and Aleksey Bildin (saxophone) joined the original trio (Ilyin, Skripkin and Babynin). With the new line-up, in 2001 the group created the last album of the trilogy to the poems of N. Gumilev, Return (the first were The Sun of Spirit and Porcelain Pavilion).  The album was first released by the French label Musea Records.  At the same time the band signed with the record label MALS, the biggest progressive music label in Russia, and the album also became available for the Russian public.

In 2003 the band released their fourth album, New Faust, a double concept album which was written back in 1997–98. In this album Faust is not only the character of a national drama who is conflicting with the society, but he is also a man of the universe seeking ways to clean his soul and acquire a spirit.

In 2006 the band released a fifth album, The Sixth Sense. In the same year the band opened the second day of the InProg 2006 festival. In 2007 the band released the first and later the second part of their sixth album based on Russian translations to Chinese poetry, Chinese Songs, with the main theme of the album being the relationship between man and nature. In 2008 the band released Cross, which was recorded in August 2007. The entire album was based on poetry by Nikolai Gumilev, In 2009 the French label Musea Records will release the Paris Symphony, an unreleased album recorded by the band in 1997 when it featured only three members.

In 2006 an event happened which attracted the media attention when the instruments of the band were stolen from their rehearsal studio. The thief was caught and the instruments were returned to the band.

In August 2008 the band recorded an instrumental Christmas album called The Magic Shop, which was written ten years before. It was released in November 2009 as a free download on the band's web-site as a Christmas gift for the fans. At the same year the band's record-label MALS re-released The Sun of Spirit and Porcelain Pavilion, with bonus-tracks, though they were re-released as Gennady Ilyin's solo albums. In 2009 the band finished recording a new album called Obsessed. The album was released in 2011.

Between 2011 and 2012 the band recorded an album called At Nights, and the mixing process went through 2013. The release date was set for January 2014. The Magic Shop, which was released as a free download few years earlier, was released on a CD by Musea Records in 2014.

In 2014 Little Tragedies held a special performance in the Kursk Philharmonic Hall to celebrate twenty years since the founding of the band. It was planned show would be later released on a double DVD. It was the first live concert held by the band since 2006. The concert was the band's first live performance in seven years, mostly due to the fact the lead singer had moved to Germany, whilst the rest remained in Kursk

In 2019, the band released Paradise behind the Stove with a different record label, Macalla records. The band celebrated the release of the new album with a show commemorating their 25's anniversary.

Discography

Studio albums 

 The Sun of Spirit – Солнце Духа (2000, Boheme Music) (2009, re-release, MALS)
 Porcelain Pavilion – Фарфоровый павильон (2000, Boheme Music) (2009, re-release, MALS)
 Return – Возвращение (2005, Musea Records) (2006, re-release, MALS)
 New Faust – Новый Фауст (2006, MALS, Double Album)
 The Sixth Sense – Шестое чувство (2006, MALS)
 Chinese Songs – Китайские песни (2007, MALS, Double Album)
 Cross – Крест (2008, MALS)
 Paris Symphony – Парижская симфония (2009, Musea Records)
 The Magic Shop – Волшебная лавка (2009, released as a free download on the internet) (2014, re-release, Musea Records)
 Obsessed – Одержимый (2011, Musea Records)
 At Nights – По ночам (2014, Musea Records)
 Paradise behind the Stove - Запечный рай (2019, Macalla records)

 Re-released in 2009 as Gennady Ilyin's solo albums by MALS.

References

External links 

 The band's official web-site
 The history of the band on their official web-site
 About the band in the Prog Archives
 An English-language interview from an Italian web-site
 English translations to the lyrics of the band
 An interview with the leader of the band on another web-site (Russian)
 History of the band on another web-site (Russian)
 An article about main Russian Progressive rock and art rock bands where Little Tragedies are mentioned (Russian)

Musea artists
Russian rock music groups
Russian progressive rock groups
Russian art rock groups
Musical groups established in 1994
1994 establishments in Russia